The 1967 All-SEC football team consists of American football players selected to the All-Southeastern Conference (SEC) chosen by various selectors for the 1967 NCAA University Division football season. Tennessee won the conference.

Offensive selections

Receivers 

 Dennis Homan, Alabama (AP-1, UPI)
Richard Trapp, Florida  (AP-1, UPI)
Freddie Hyatt, Alabama (AP-2)
Richmond Flowers, Tennessee (AP-2)
Mac Halk, Ole Miss (AP-2)

Tight ends 
Bob Goodridge, Vanderbilt (AP-1, UPI)

Tackles 

Edgar Chandler, Georgia (AP-1, UPI)
 John Boynton, Tennessee (AP-1, UPI)
 Alan Bush, Ole Miss (AP-2)
 Elliott Gammage, Tennessee (AP-2)

Guards 
 Guy Dennis, Florida (AP-1, UPI)
 Charles Rosenfelder, Tennessee (AP-1)
 Bruce Stephens, Alabama (AP-2, UPI)
 Don Hayes, Georgia (AP-2)

Centers 
 Bob Johnson, Tennessee  (AP-1, UPI)
 Barry Wilson, LSU (AP-2)

Quarterbacks 

 Ken Stabler, Alabama (AP-1, UPI)
 Nelson Stokley, LSU (AP-2)

Running backs 

Larry Smith, Florida (AP-1, UPI)
Ronnie Jenkins, Georgia (AP-1)
Dicky Lyons, Kentucky (UPI)
Steve Hindman, Ole Miss (AP-2)
Walter Chadwick, Tennessee (AP-2)

Defensive selections

Ends 

 John Garlington, LSU  (AP-1, UPI)
 Mike Ford, Alabama (AP-1)
 Larry Kohn, Georgia (UPI)
 Jerry Richardson, Ole Miss (AP-2)
 Nick Showalter, Tennessee (AP-2)

Tackles 

 Bill Stanfill, Georgia (College Football Hall of Fame)  (AP-1, UPI)
 Jim Urbanek, Ole Miss (AP-1, UPI)
 Charles Collins, Auburn (AP-2)
 Glenn Higgins, Miss. St. (AP-2)

Middle guard 

 Gusty Yearout, Auburn (AP-1, UPI)
 Don Giordano, Florida (AP-2)
 Dan Sartin, Ole Miss (AP-2)

Linebackers 

 Mike Hall, Alabama (AP-1 [as MG], UPI)
 D. D. Lewis, Miss. St. (College Football Hall of Fame)   (AP-1, UPI)
Jimmy Keyes, Ole Miss (AP-1, UPI)
Steve Kiner, Tennessee (College Football Hall of Fame)  (AP-2)
Robert Margeson, Auburn (AP-2)

Backs 
Albert Dorsey, Tennessee (AP-1, UPI)
Sammy Grezaffi, LSU (AP-1, UPI)
Jake Scott, Georgia (College Football Hall of Fame)  (AP-1)
Bobby Johns, Alabama (UPI)
Buddy McClinton, Auburn (AP-2)
Tommy James, Ole Miss (AP-2)
Mike Jones, Tennessee (AP-2)

Special teams

Kicker 

 Wayne Barfield, Florida (AP-1)
Karl Kremser, Tennessee (AP-2)

Punter 

 Eddie Ray, LSU (AP-1)
Julian Fagan, Ole Miss (AP-2)

Key

AP = Associated Press

UPI = United Press International

Bold = Consensus first-team selection by both AP and UPI

See also
1967 College Football All-America Team

References

All-SEC
All-SEC football teams